Ghanaians in the United Kingdom (also British Ghanaians) encompass both Ghana-born immigrants and their descendants living in the United Kingdom. Immigration to the UK accelerated following the independence of Ghana from the British Empire  in 1957, with most British Ghanaians having migrated to the UK between the 1960s to the 1980s owing to poor economic conditions at home.

The 2011 census recorded 95,666 people born in Ghana living in the UK, up from 56,112 in 2001. The most recent estimate by the Office for National Statistics in 2019 estimated that the Ghanaian-born population accounted for 114,000 residents of the UK. None of these figures account for British-born individuals of Ghanaian descent.

History

Early
Although modern Ghana gained independence from the United Kingdom in 1957 and was the first African country to do so, small numbers of people from that region have been arriving and living in Britain since at least the mid-sixteenth century. At that time, there were many Africans living and working in London, some of whom were based at the royal court. Even Shakespeare, it is rumoured, sought the company of an African lady, Lucy Morgan.

In 1555, John Lok, a London merchant and Alderman, brought five Africans from the town of Shama, in what is present-day Ghana, to London to be trained as interpreters in order to assist England's trade with the western coast of Africa. From that time onwards, economic links were established between West Africa and England. The English were most concerned with acquiring gold from the region that came to be known as the Gold Coast. Pepper and other spices were also much in demand in Europe.

Besides a number of West Africans arriving in Britain during the 16th–18th centuries, there were Britons who went to the Gold Coast and married Ghanaian women. Some Ghanaians have Scottish and English ancestry, since a number of Scots and Englishmen married in local customary ceremonies and had children who became successful, such as Gold Coast's James Bannerman and Robert William Wallace Bruce. Most Scottish and English settlers left the Gold Coast after it won independence.

Modern
By the 1980s and early-1990s, ten to twenty percent of Ghanaians were living outside Ghana, with many migrating to other countries in Africa, the Middle East, the United States and Europe from the 1970s to the 1980s due to poor economic conditions at those times in Ghana.

Culture

Film and television
Ghanaian British actors such as Freema Agyeman, Cynthia Addai-Robinson, Idris Elba and Peter Mensah have successfully crossed over into the international market and primarily work in Hollywood.

Music
Ghanaian music and musicians have a strong influence on the overall Ghanaian British community as well as British music in general, from traditional Ghanaian music to Afrobeats, hip-hop and grime, the UK has produced many fine artists. The Ghana Music Awards UK began in 2002 with an aim to promote and award the best achieving Ghanaian British musicians. By the 1980s, the UK was experiencing a boom in African music as Ghanaians and others moved there, immediately they made their presence felt in the form of local gigs and carnivals, and to this day Ghanaians and other African groups prevail as the most successful ethnic groups in the UK R&B and rap scene. Artiste such as Stormzy, Dizzee Rascal and Fuse ODG are a household names in the UK and have won numerous awards, Tinchy Stryder, Donae'o, Oxide & Neutrino, Abra Cadabra, Headie One, Sway DaSafo, Tempa T, Lethal Bizzle, Novelist and The Mitchell Brothers have also received numerous nominations and awards (including the MOBO Awards, Mercury Prize and BET Awards). Another notable Ghanaian British musician who chose to stray away from the typical hip-hop scene is Rhian Benson, who now lives in Los Angeles and is noted for being a Singer-songwriter, composer, instrumentalist and record producer who performs mainly jazz and soul music.

Cuisine

Other
Miss Ghana UK is a beauty pageant that has been up and running since 1995, it aims to highlight Ghana's rich cultural heritage. Attendances per show attracted over 3,000 by 2009.

In London, Ghana's Official Independence Celebration is a celebration of the African nation's independence. The event was founded by Abrantee Boateng also known as DJ Abrantee and business partners, Alordia and Edmond in 2000.

Demographics

Population
At the time of the 1961 United Kingdom census, around 10,000 people born in Ghana were resident in the UK. The 2001 UK census recorded 56,112 Ghanaian-born people. The 2011 UK census recorded 93,312 Ghanaian-born residents in England, 534 in Wales, 1,658 in Scotland, and 162 in Northern Ireland. The Office for National Statistics estimates that the Ghanaian-born population of the UK was 114,000 in 2019.

Distribution
Most Ghanaians in the UK live in Greater London. At the time of the 2011 census, the largest Ghanaian-born populations were found in the London boroughs of Lambeth,  Southwark, Croydon, Newham, Enfield, Hackney, Haringey, Lewisham, Waltham Forest, Brent and Barking and Dagenham, and in Milton Keynes, the county of West Midlands, and Greater Manchester.

Economics
Research published in 2005 showed that 63.70% of recent Ghanaian immigrants to the UK of working age were employed (compared to 73.49% for British-born people regardless of race or ethnic background). 17.19% of recent immigrants were low earners, paid less than £149.20 per week (compared to 21.08% for British-born people), and 3.13% were high earners, paid more than £750 per week (compared to 6.98% for British-born people). The percentages for settled immigrants were slightly different: 69.51% were employed, with 15.04% being low earners and 5.31% high earners.

Notable individuals

See also
Ghana
Black Scottish people
Ghanaian Australian
Ghanaian American
Black British people

References

Bibliography

External links
 News about Ghanaian community in United Kingdom

 
Ghanaian
Immigration to the United Kingdom by country of origin